Lieutenant General Jabu Mbuli was a South African Army officer from the Air Defence Artillery who served as Chief of Logistics for the South African National Defence Force.

He joined Umkhonto we Sizwe and was trained in Angola. He was appointed as the GOC ADA Formation, Chief Director Defence Acquisition Management  in 2014 and Chief of Logistics upon retirement of Lt Gen Morris Moadira in 2017. Lt Gen Mbuli also serves as the General of the Gunners of South Africa from 2017. He retired from the SANDF on 31 December 2022 and was succeeded by the Deputy Chief of Logistics - Lt Gen XB Ndhlovu on 1 January 2023.

Awards and decorations

References

 

 

Living people
South African Army generals
1963 births
People from Springs, Gauteng